The Unbreakable Boy is an upcoming American drama film directed and written by Jon Gunn. It is based on the book of the same name The Unbreakable Boy: A Father's Fear, a Son's Courage, and a Story of Unconditional Love, authored by Scott Michael LeRette and Suzy Flory, which is based on a true story. The film stars Zachary Levi in the lead role.

The film is scheduled to be released by Kingdom Story Company and Lionsgate.

Premise
Austin is a disabled boy who has brittle bone disease and autism. His father, Scott, always keeps Austin happy.

Cast
 Zachary Levi as Scott LeRette, Austin's father
 Jacob Laval as Austin LeRette, a disabled autistic boy who has brittle bones disease
 Meghann Fahy as Teresa
 Peter Facinelli as Preacher Rick
 Drew Powell 
 Gavin Warren as Logan LeRette
 Pilot Bunch as Tyler
 Patricia Heaton
 Amy Acker as Lori
 Sarah Dean as Extra
 Todd Terry as Dick
 Kevin Downes as Lyle
 Mattie Ward and Justin Russell as AA Members
 Bruce Davis as Autism Doctor
 Ashtyn Barlow Nguyen as Cheerleader
 Lena Harmon as Doctor
 Alexandra Swanbeck as Nurse

Production
The Unbreakable Boy was announced on November 13, 2020 by the Erwin brothers. On November 17, 2020, it was announced that Zachary Levi would star in the film. On November 20, 2020, it was announced that Jacob Laval, Meghann Fahy, Peter Facinelli, Drew Powell, Pilot Bunch, and Patricia Heaton have joined the cast. The filming was completed in Oklahoma during the COVID-19 pandemic in early 2021.

On November 29, 2021, it was announced that Pancho Burgos-Goizueta would score the film.

Release
The film was originally scheduled to be theatrically released on March 18, 2022, but was pulled from Lionsgate's release schedule in March 2022 with no replacement date currently set.

References

External links
 
 

Upcoming films
Upcoming English-language films
American drama films
American biographical drama films
Films based on books
American independent films
Films directed by Jon Gunn
Films produced by Kevin Downes